Mohindra is an Indian name.

People with the given name 

 Mohindra Kumar Ghosh (born 1893), Indian politician

List of people with the surname 

 Anjli Mohindra (born 1990), British actress
 Atul Mohindra (born 1966), Indian former cricket player
 Brahm Mohindra (born 1946), Indian politician
 Gagan Mohindra (born 1978), British politician
 Vijat Mohindra (born 1985), American fashion photographer

See also 

 Mahendra

Given names
Surnames
Surnames of Indian origin
Indian masculine given names